Barylambdidae is an extinct family of pantodont mammals from North America.

References

Pantodonts
Paleogene mammals of North America
Prehistoric mammal families